Peter Connor may refer to:

Peter S. Connor (1932–1966), United States Marine Corps staff sergeant posthumously awarded the Medal of Honor
Peter Connor (canoeist) (born 1963), Irish sprint canoer
Peter Connor (footballer), English former footballer

See also
Peter O'Connor (disambiguation)